Jandai is an extinct Australian Aboriginal language of the Quandamooka people who live around the Moreton Bay region of Queensland. Other names and spellings are Coobenpil; Djandai; Djendewal; Dsandai; Goenpul; Janday; Jendairwal; Jundai; Koenpel; Noogoon; Tchandi. Traditionally spoken by members of the Goenpul people, it has close affinities with Nunukul language (spoken by the Nunukul people) and Gowar language (spoken by the Ngugi people). Today now only few members still speak it.

Classification 
The three tribes that comprise the Quandamooka people spoke dialects of a Durubalic language. The language that the Goenpul tribe of central and southern Stradbroke Island speaks is Jandai, and the Nunukul dialect of northern Stradbroke island was called Moondjan, the term for its distinctive word for "no".

Bowern (2011) lists five Durubalic languages:

 Jandai (Janday)
 Turrubal (Turubul) and Yagara (Jagara)
 Nunukul (Nunungal, Moonjan)
 Gowar (Guwar)

Dixon (2002) considers all but Guwar to be different dialects of the Yagara language.

Vocabulary 
Some words from the Jandai language include:

 Maroomba bigi/maroomba biggee: good day
 Juwanbinl: bird
 Buneen: echidna
 Gagarr: fish
 Murri: kangaroo
 Dumbirrbi: koala
 Gabul: snake
 Bingil: grass
 Humpi: home/camp
 Djara: land
 Juhrram: rain
 Bigi: sun
 Dabbil: water
 Bargan: boomerang
 Goondool: canoe
 Jahlo: fire
 Marra: hand
 Jalwang: knife
 Tabbil: water
 Wanya: where?

References 

Durubalic languages
Extinct languages of Queensland